The  was a professional wrestling championship contested in Wrestling International New Generations. It was briefly revived in International Wrestling Association of Japan in 1995.

Title history

Reigns

Combined reigns

Notes

See also
 IWA World Heavyweight Championship (IWA Japan)

References

External links

World heavyweight wrestling championships
Hardcore wrestling championships
International Wrestling Association of Japan